is a cape located on the southernmost tip of the Oshima Peninsula in Matsumae, Hokkaidō, Japan. It is the southernmost point of Hokkaidō.

See also
Extreme points of Japan

Landforms of Hokkaido
Shirakami
Matsumae, Hokkaido